Mahdyar Aghajani (born 22 January 1989) is a musician, record producer and composer born and raised in Tehran, Iran. He raised the standard of Iranian underground music, using Persian traditional instruments (such as oud, santoor, daf, tombak, ney, kamancheh and qanoon) in electronic and hip hop music.

Career
In 2005 Hichkas released the first Iranian hip hop album Jangale Asfalt (The Asphalt Jungle).  Mahdyar Aghajani, musician and producer of this album, integrated hip hop and Iranian traditional music in a creative way. Mahdyar's production on Jangale Asfalt has nonetheless set a new benchmark in the evolution of Persian rap, with tracks like "Vatan Parast" ("The Patriot") serving as the fusion of Iranian/Middle Eastern harmonies and pounding urban protest music.

After an interview with Nasim-E-Haraz magazine regarding the release of his first mainstream album in 2006 with Hichkas, Mahdyar faced pressured from the Iranian government. This was the most influential collaboration between Hichkas and Mahdyar and music they produced together was listened throughout Europe and Iran, so much so the government noticed the artists as a threat to the culture of Iran and had his name listed as a threat, despite use of traditional Iranian instruments and strong nationalistic lyrics.

In 2009 Mahdyar composed the original soundtrack for the film No One Knows About Persian Cats. The film criticizes Iranian government policies regarding underground music. No One Knows About Persian Cats success at the 2009 Cannes Film Festival got part of the crew of the film in trouble with Iranian authorities. The pressure resulted in Mahdyar leaving his family behind at the age of 20 and he fled to Berlin then to Paris where he currently resides. He is busy with the production for couple of albums including Hichkas's forthcoming album and his own debut album

Soundtracks

Feature films
2009: No One Knows About Persian Cats
2014: Rosewater 
2014: Desert Dancer

Short films 
 2008: The Official Prince of Persia
 2010: Demandez au Vent

Documentaries 
 2010: Cultures of Resistance
 2011: Chroniques d'un Iran Interdit
 2015: K2 and the Invisible Footmen
 2016: Cast from the Storm
 2017: Burkinabè Rising

Solo

Albums
2018: Seized

Singles
2011: Weasels and Warcries 
2011: New Bloom
2013: Bang
2016: Gomrok
2017: Money Money

Production credits

2006
Hichkas – The Asphalt Jungle 
01. "Moghaddame"
02. "Dide o Del (feat. Reveal, Amin Fooladi and Bidad)"
03. "Ekhtelaf"
04. "Man Vaystadam"
05. "Introduction"
06. "Ghanoon"
07. "Vatan Parast (feat. Reveal and Amin Fooladi)"
08. "Oun Manam"
09. "Bar Paa"
10. "Zendan (featuring Reveal)"
11. "Dide o Del (Remix) (feat. Reveal, Amin Fooladi and Bidad)"
12. "Har Tor Shodeh Migam (Bonus Track)"

2008
Hichkas
"Bunch of Soldiers"Ye Mosht Sarbaz"

2009
Bahman Ghobadi – No One Knows About Persian Cats
12. "Jouwani"

2010
Hichkas
"Ye Rooze Khoob Miad"
This song has become an instant hit, often blasting from cars on Tehran's busy streets in capital city Tehran.

2011
The Tour of Duty EP 
01. "Hichkas - Anjām Vazife"
02. "Reveal - 021LDN"
03. "Hichkas - Mā Az Ounāshim"
04. "Fadaei - Vāstā Lāshi"
05. "Quf - Shak (feat. Fadaei)"

Quf – Zir o Bam e Zirzamin 
01. "Sobhe Masnavi"
02. "Balatar 1"
03. "Tariki"
04. "Hadaf (feat. Bidad)"
05. "I.R.A.N. (feat. 7Khat)"
06. "Hesse Gharib"
07. "Khavar Miane (feat. Lowkey)"
08. "Fazaye Sard"
09. "Marjan (feat. Reveal)"
10. "Miane Ghamhayam (feat. Fadaei)"
11. "Balatar 2"
12. "Shabe Khazan"

2012
Hichkas - Young N Foolish (feat. Reveal & Quf & Kool G Rap)
Fadaei - Adl EP
01. "Zendegi"
02. "Sarzamine Madari"
03. "Chi Shenidi (Feat. Hichkas)"
04. "Jabe Jadooyi"
05. "80 (Feat. Quf)"
06. "Nemidoonam"

2013
Birdy Nam Nam - Written in the Sand (Mahdyar Aghajani Remix)

2018
Mahdyar Aghajani - Seized
01. Seize
02. Money Money
03. Timmy Might Bury Y’all
04. Vow
05. Hush
06. Iran Iraq
07. Khakis
08. Running from
09. Lust
10. Glimmer of
11. Twist the Facts

2020
Hichkas - Mojaz
01." Rosva"
02." To koja boodi?"
03." Sakhte mosalmoon boodan"
04." Ghazi mano doost dasht"
05." Man kiam?"
06." Chera nemimiri?"
07." Az ashnayitoon khoshalam"
08." Shabi gorga"
09." Khalaaf kaaraye asli"
10." Terroreshoon kon"
11." Jadvalo roya"
12." Sheytoone mige"
13." Ki mige"
14." Ye maks"
15." Mahze mokhaalefat"
16." Va zir"
Quf - Tarane alidoosti
Fadaei - Dige Tablo Shode
Fadaei - Abi GHermaz
Shapur - Ettelaat

2021
Fadaei - Koli
Fadaei - Bilit
Fadaei - Fatehe 
Fadaei - Sarnegooni 
Shapur - Ghasem kojayi
Fadaei - Az Karaj Ta Langerud

2022
Fadaei - Hagh
01." Moghaddame"
02." Tavaf"
03." Alef"
04." Maslahati"
05." Timarestane Dahe 60"
06." Mehr O Raha"
07." Mage Chi Mishe"
08." Mohajer"
09." Narefigh"
10." Zard"
11." Az Samime Ghalb"
12." Rahbar"
13." Khoon"
Shapur - Marg Bar Kolle Nezam
Fadaei - Taskhir
Fadaei - Meshki

References

External links
 Official site
 
 A case study of Mahdyar Aghajani on 'Big Studio Secrets for Home Recording and Production'
 Mahdyar Interview With Newsweek'

1989 births
Living people
Musicians from Tehran
Iranian hip hop musicians
Iranian songwriters
Iranian music arrangers